Major-General Denys Whitehorn Reid  (24 March 1897 – 28 November 1970) was an officer in the British Army and the British Indian Army during World War I and World War II.

Early life, First World War and inter-war years
He was born in Dundee on 24 March 1897. His father was the Rev John Reid, minister of Ness Bank Church in Inverness, and his mother was Clara Whitehorn, from London.

Reid joined the London Scottish in October 1914, and was commissioned into the Seaforth Highlanders in Jan 1915. He volunteered for early active service as a Trench Mortar officer, winning his first Military Cross at Ploegsteert Wood on 19 Jan 1916. The citation for this award reads: He took part in the Somme offensive and was wounded at Thiepval on 7 July 1916. He rejoined the 7 Seaforth Highlanders as C Coy commander, seeing further action at Arras and Passchendaele, where he was wounded again on 12 Oct 1917. On 23 March 1918 he was awarded a bar to the Military Cross for a rearguard action across the Canal du Nord at Manancourt. The citation for this award reads:
Three weeks later he was awarded the Distinguished Service Order for a strenuous attack at Wytschaete. The citation in the London Gazette reads:

As the war came to an end, an uncle, unbeknown to Reid, had sent in his name to the India Office in response to an appeal for officers to join the British Indian Army. In August 1918 Reid took a probationary drop in rank from Captain to Lieutenant to make the transfer. He served as Company commander with the 2/103rd Mahratta Light Infantry at Belgaum from September 1918 until November 1920. He was promoted to Captain in 1920 and posted to 1/103rd Mahratta Light Infantry as Company commander, based at Lahore until April 1922. 
When the first five Indian Territorial Battalions were created as part of a major re-organisation of the Indian Army, he was posted to Bombay as the Adjutant of the newly created 11/4 Bombay Grenadiers from 1922 to 1925. After long leave in Britain he returned as Regimental Duty Company commander of the 1/5th Mahratta Light Infantry from 1926 with detachments to the Andaman Islands (1926–1928), Santa Cruz and Mandalay. In November 1930 he was involved in a train crash but escaped with minor bruising and returned to Calcutta for ceremonial duties, In April 1933 he led B Company 1/5th Mahratta Light Infantry on a detachment into Tibet as military escort to the incumbent British Trade Agent at Yatung and Gyanste providing ceremonial escort for the formal visit of F W Williamson, British Political Officer in Sikkim. 
On 4 January 1934 he was promoted Major and completed a tour of duty in Peshawar and the North West Frontier with the 1/5th Mahrattas at Landikotal, the highest point of the Khyber Pass, in the summer months and Shagai Fort, near Ali Masjid in the winter. During this time he also served as Secretary to the Peshawar Vale Hunt. After a further long leave, he was posted to the 3rd battalion 5th Mahratta Light Infantry in April 1938 as second in command, and worked at the Indian Army HQ, Simla, on mobilisation plans.

World War II
At the outbreak of war Reid, who had until then been contemplating imminent retirement, was based at Secunderabad. His services were retained and in June 1940 he embarked with the 3/5th Mahratta Light Infantry for the East African campaign. In November 1940 he was made acting lieutenant-colonel and given command of the battalion which he led in the East African Campaign as part of Indian 5th Infantry Division's 9th Infantry Brigade. Of particular note was the battalion's capture of the Pinnacle on the night of 15 March 1941 during the Battle of Keren. Compton Mackenzie in his book Eastern Epic, the authorised history of the Indian Army from the start of the war until the battle of Alamein, described it as:  
For his part in this action Reid was awarded a bar to his Distinguished Service Order. The citation reads:

His rank of Lieutenant-Colonel was made substantive (permanent) in May 1941.

On 5 June Indian Division moved first to Egypt and then Iraq. In support of Operation Crusader he formed 'E Force', a mixed arms force composed of a battalion of infantry and engineers from his brigade and a South African armoured car regiment and reconnaissance battalion supported by South African and British artillery detachments. Setting off from Jarubab on 18 November he attacked the deep desert oasis of Jialo on 24 November, capturing it after an all-day battle. The oasis then served as a forward operating base for David Stirling's nascent SAS. For this action he was awarded the CBE. The citation reads:

In February 1942 he took command briefly at Tobruk for one month before moving to El Adem during the Battle of Gazala. On 28 June 1942 he was captured when his brigade was overrun in a rearguard action at the Fuka Pass during the withdrawal to Alamein. He spent sixteen months as a prisoner of war in Sulmona POW camp PG78, Italy eventually escaping with two other Brigadiers through the British 8th Army lines at Cassino on 9 November 1943.

In February 1944 he was given command of the 10th Indian Division during the Italian Campaign, for the assault on the Gothic Line and during the 1945 spring offensive. Major-General Reid received the CB in 1945 and the United States Commander, Legion of Merit in 1948 for his services as Divisional Commander in this campaign. The citation for this latter award reads:

He retired from the army on 12 July 1947 and lived in Somerset.

References

Bibliography

External links
Generals of World War II

1897 births
1970 deaths
British Indian Army generals
British Army personnel of World War I
Indian Army generals of World War II
Commanders of the Order of the British Empire
Companions of the Order of the Bath
Seaforth Highlanders officers
World War II prisoners of war held by Italy
British World War II prisoners of war
Recipients of the Military Cross
Companions of the Distinguished Service Order
Commanders of the Legion of Merit
Military personnel from Dundee
Indian Army personnel of World War I